Alice Gainer (born July 3, 1982) is an American anchor and reporter for WCBS-TV and WLNY-TV, New York. Prior to WCBS Gainer worked at WNYW Fox 5, New York and for eight years before that, worked as an Anchor/Reporter at News 12 New Jersey. She has also appeared on News 12 Westchester, CNN, Fox News Channel and Fox Business Happy Hour.

Gainer graduated from Fordham University in 2004 with a degree in Communications: TV and Radio and a minor in Business Administration.  At Fordham she was an anchor for WFUV, the university's NPR affiliated radio station, and won a Gracie Award in the category "Individual Achievement for Best Anchor (Radio)".  She was also an anchor for the campus television station. After graduating Gainer worked for NPR affiliate  WBGO radio  and also for MetroNetworks WOR, WABC, and Air America Satellite Radio.

Gainer is the recipient of eight NY Emmy Awards for "Breaking/Spot News", "Crime News", and "Entertainment News" among other categories. She's been nominated more than a dozen times  times in the categories "LIVE- reporter", "Spot News", "Entertainment News", "Crime News" and "Health/Science". At the age of 25 and after only 2 years as a television reporter she was nominated for a New York Emmy for "On-Camera Achievement -Live Reporter". She was the recipient of a 2010 1st place Associated Press award for "Best Continuing Coverage". Other awards include a 1st place AP award for "Best Election Coverage" with the WBGO news team and a Public Radio News Directors Incorporated award.
She's appeared in the movies "The Bourne Legacy" as an MSNBC anchor  "Delivery Man" and "The Week Of". She also appeared as a reporter on the CBS show Bull. Gainer was also a principal actor in a New York Mega Millions commercial where she played a news anchor and has also appeared in several MTV commercials.

Gainer competed for the title of Miss New Jersey USA and placed in the top 15 for several years. She also held the title of Miss Somerset County 2006, in the Miss America Organization. In high school, she was captain of the Varsity swim team and an all-county swimmer. She also played Varsity soccer . At Fordham, she was captain of the nationally competitive dance team. On July 17, 2018, she posted on Twitter that she is engaged to her boyfriend. In 2019 they were married.

References 

1982 births
Living people
Fordham University alumni
American reporters and correspondents
American women television journalists
WFUV people
21st-century American women